Edappally or Idappalli is a region in the city of Kochi, Kerala, India. It is a major commercial centre as well as a prominent residential region. Edappally junction is one of the busiest junctions in the city.

History
Edappally in English literally translates as Eda, short for edaykku (Malayalam term for "in-between") and Pallykollunna Sthalam (Malayalam term for "the place or palace where Kings(Rajas) used to take rest ). The name is connected with Edappally Palace and Edappally rajas.

Economy
Edappally is said to be one of the fastest-growing areas in the city of Kochi. Edappally was the seat of the Edapally Rajas, the rulers of the area. Edappally was a Panchayath before getting included in Cochin Corporation.  The Cochin corporation limits start from the traffic signal (Lulu Mall signal) towards Ernakulam and Palarivattom . The area that covers Edappally toll and Lulu Mall is in Kalamassery Municipality limits. This is a place which comes partly under Thrikkakara legislative constituency and partly under Ernakulam constituency.

Transport
The Cochin bypass connects Edappally with Aroor which is an industrial town on the south end of Cochin. The Bypass Junction in Edappally is the north end of the Cochin bypass which extends up to Aroor. This entire route is evolving into a major business hub with big-time stores and five-star hotels. The world-famous museum of Kerala History and sculpture is also located in Edappally (outside the city limits). Thrikkakkara temple is only 2 kilometres away from Edappally Toll junction, and the village of Vattekkunnam is connected via a railway tunnel.

Two national highways NH 544 and NH 66 join the Kochi Bypass junction at Edappally. At Edappally, The National Highway 66 passes and continues up to Panvel, Maharashtra.  Edappally is also connected by rail, and there is a railway station at Edappally. The Edappally Railway Overbrige was inaugurated on 4 February 2012. It helps passengers, so that they can have a convenient journey between Ernakulam-Guruvayoor Route (NH 66).

Edappally North (Kunnumpuram Junction) is the next main junction after Edappally junction, on the way to Guruvayur from Ernakulam. Edappally Kunnumpuram Junction is the main junction when turning to the Amrita Institute of Medical Sciences (a left turn), Amrita School of Arts and Science (a right turn), Manjummel (a turn to the east), Parur (straight).

There is also the Edappally Metro Station, which is located near Edappally Station Kavala.

Entertainment
Oberon Mall – Oberon Mall is the first full-format mall in Kerala, located on the NH bypass road, just a kilometre from the Edapally Junction. Oberon Mall also has the first multiplex theatre facility in Kerala.
LuLu International Shopping Mall – Lulu Mall is the largest shopping mall in India, located in the Edapally neighbourhood of Kochi in Kerala.[1] It is built on an area of 17 acres, with the total area occupied by the mall alone at 2,700,000 square feet (250,000 m2). A premium five-star 300 room hotel managed by JW Marriott Hotels is located near the mall.
Changampuzha Samskarika Kendram- consisting of a small children's park, two open auditoriums where programmes are organised almost every day, these programmes include various art forms, literary activities and other cultural items.
Raghavan Pillai Park- a small park near Ponekkara with a children's play area.
Edappally Railway Overbridge was inaugurated on 4 February 2012. Edappally North (Kunnumpuram Junction) is the next main junction after Edapally junction, on way to Guruvayur from Ernakulam. Edappally Kunnumpuram Junction is the main junction to turn to Amrita Institute of Medical Sciences(Left Turn), Amrita School of Arts and Science (Right Turn), Manjummel (East Turn), Parur (Straight). Poysha Residents'Association(PRA), Kunnumpuram Central Residents' Association (KCRA), Ambedkar Road Residents'Association(ARRA), Mannam Road Residents' Association (ARRA) are the major Residents associations here.
Oasis Mall – Oasis Mall is owned by Landmark Group who are also owners of popular outlets like Splash, Homecenter, Lifestyle etc. located on the NH bypass road, bang opposite to Lulu Mall towards Vytilla direction.

Places of Worship
Special mention has to be made about two places of worships of Edappally

The Edappally Ganapathy Temple is one of the most important Ganapathy temples in the state visited by devotees,  from all over the state. The temple is referred to in the Aithihya Mala of Kottarathil Sankunni. Visiting time in the morning is between 5.00 and 7.30 AM. The members of the Edappally royal family worship after these hours, since it is their family temple. During the evening time also the temple is kept open.  Ganapathy Homam and Unniyappam are important offerings. Unniyappam is booked months in advance. It is believed that Breaking a coconut before beginning a project will see that it is completed successfully.
St. George Syro-Malabar Catholic Forane Church, Edappally:- St. George, the dragon slayer, is the presiding saint. It is under the control of the Syrian Catholic Diocese of Ernakulam. Praying at the shrine on the way on any journey is considered auspicious, even by people of other faiths. The offering is simply candles and coins which go into the collection box.
Edappally Juma Masjid
Perandoor Temple, Thrickovil Sree Krishna Temple, Puthukkalavattam Mahadeva Temple, Punnakkal Bhagavathy Temple, Ponekkara Bhagavathy Temple are important places of worship. The Elamakkara Lourde Matha church is another noted place of worship, which has a history,  spanning over 100 years.
Chendankulangara Sreekrishna Swamy Temple, Located on the way to Amrita Institute of Medical Science Hospital, Ponekkara, the Main deity is Lord Krishna.

Ponel St. Francis Xavier's Church est.in 1927 - Bharat award winner film actor P J Antony buried in the cemetery of the church

Famous temples, Edappally North Puthukkulangara Bhagavathi Temple and Puthukulangara Mahavishnu Temple are at Kunnumpuram Junction (Edappally North)
Ponekkara Bhagavati Temple, Chandankulangara Temple, Edappally Mariyamman Temple

 The Edappally Mariyamman Temple is Located on the way to Amrita Institute of Medical Science Hospital, Ponekkara Road.
 Blessing Today International Church, Pathadippalam

Celebrities
Changampuzha Krishna Pillai
Edappally Raghavan Pillai
Balachandran Chullikkad, Poet
Vijayalakshmi, Poet
A C Jose, Politician
Aashiq Abu, Film Maker
Sijoy Varghese, Actor, Ad Film Director
Thoppil anto, Singer
A C GEORGE, Politician

List Of Public Library

Changampuzha Smaraka Library and Edappally North Friends' Library are situated in Edappally. Edappally North Friends' Library celebrated Golden Jubilee in 2007 January. Education and Career Guidance Reference Library started as part of its golden jubilee celebration.

Changampuzha Samskarika Kendram organizes various cultural and academic programmes, which include Kathakali, dramas, music, children's programmes, Akshara slokas, various cultural meetings, discussions, etc. A Senior Citizens' Forum is well functioning attached to this Kendram.

Another institution at Edappally is Changampuzha Smaraka Grandhasala, a library established in 1950 as a memorial to the Malayalam poet Changampuzha Krishna Pillai. This library has a collection of about thirty-six thousand titles and a reference section (approved as the Kanayannur Taluk Reference Library). This has an Art wing offering training in various types of dances, music (vocal and instrumental), painting and drawing, etc. About six hundred students undergo training in these. Beside that there is also the M N F Gallery of Paintings and Sculptures.

Educational Institutions 
Main educational institutions at Edappally are

 Traum Academy for German and French Languages
Amrita Institute of Medical Sciences (AIMS)
Amrita School of Arts and Sciences
Jai Bharath B Ed Training College Thrikkakara
Govt. Vocational and Higher Secondary School - Edappally North
Al Ameen Public School
Govt. Higher Secondary School Edappally
St. George's Boys' High School
St. Pius' Girls' High School
Campion School
Bharathiya Vidya Bhavan Elamakkara
Regional Centre of MG University for Computer Science and applications.
Government Teacher Training Institute(TTC) Devankulangara.
ICS india group of institutions , edappally toll (https://ics-worldwide.com/)

List Of Residential Areas
Amrita Nagar.
Ponekkara.
Elamakkara.
SMS VISTA  Apartments by SMS Builders
SMS TEJUS  Apartments by SMS Builders

External links 
 Changampuzha park
 News article on Edappally's past

Location

References 

Neighbourhoods in Kochi